Wavel is a Palestinian refugee camp near the city of Baalbeck in Lebanon. It was originally a French army barrack, but in 1948 refugees from the 1948 Arab-Israeli war found shelter there. In 1952, UNRWA took over responsibility for providing services in the camp.

Wavel today
As of 2013, there were 8806 registered refugees in the camp. In 2009 there were approximately 3000 refugees within the camp and a similar number living outside the camp. There are also two UNRWA schools, including a secondary school and one health centre. Major issues affecting the camp are harsh living conditions, high school drop-out rate and limited employment opportunities

Footnotes

See also
 Palestinian refugee camps
 Palestinian refugee
 UNRWA
 Baalbek

External links
 Wavel , articles from UNWRA (dead link needs archiving?)
 https://www.unrwa.org/where-we-work/lebanon/wavel-camp Retrieved 15 July 2019
 Photo from Wavel

Populated places established in 1948
Palestinian refugee camps in Lebanon